Hong Kong first competed at the Asian Games in 1954.

Asian Games

Medals by Games

Asian Para Games

Medals by Games

Asian Beach Games

Medals by Games

Asian Indoor and Martial Arts Games

Medals by Games

Asian Youth Games

Medals by Games

Asian Youth Para Games

Medals by Games

East Asian Games

*Red border color indicates tournament was held on home soil.

Medals by Games

See also

 Hong Kong at the Olympics
 Hong Kong at the Commonwealth Games
 Hong Kong bid for the 2006 Asian Games

References